Roberto Andrés "Palo" Pandolfo (November 22, 1964 – July 22, 2021) was an Argentine singer, musician, guitarist and producer of Argentine rock. In the 1980s, he was leader of the post-punk band Don Cornelio y la Zona, and led  in the following decade. Through his solo career, he released over five albums independently.

Discography

Don Cornelio y la Zona 
Don Cornelio y la Zona (1987)
Patria o muerte (1988)
En vivo (1989)

Los Visitantes 
Salud universal  (1993)
Espiritango (1994) 
En caliente (1995)
Maderita (1996)
Desequilibrio (1998)
Herido de distancia (1999)

Soloist 
A través de los sueños (2001)
Intuición (2003)
Antojo (2004)
Ritual criollo (2008)
Esto es un abrazo (2013)

References

External Links
 
 

1964 births
2021 deaths
Rock en Español musicians
20th-century Argentine male singers
Argentine male singer-songwriters
Singers  from Buenos Aires
21st-century Argentine male singers